Robert N. Dunn (March 10, 1857 – January 17, 1925) was Justice of the Idaho Supreme Court from 1921 to 1925, serving as chief justice from January 5, 1924, until his death in 1925.

Born in Warsaw, Missouri, Dunn moved to Idaho in 1891, first residing in Wallace, where he helped his brother A.J. Dunn to establish a newspaper, and later in Coeur D'Alene, where he served as Registrar of the Land Office for a time. Dunn was a candidate for the United States Senate in the 1913 United States Senate election, but only received four votes in the Idaho legislature.

Dunn died at his home in Boise, Idaho, at the age of 67.

References

1857 births
1925 deaths
People from Benton County, Missouri
Justices of the Idaho Supreme Court